The Journal of Social, Political and Economic Studies is a quarterly journal published by the Council for Social and Economic Studies. It was founded in 1976 by anthropologist Roger Pearson, and was originally published by The Council of American Affairs, an American representative in the World Anti Communist League. It is now published by the Council for Social and Economic Studies, of which Pearson was the president as of 1982. It has been identified as one of two international journals which regularly publishes articles pertaining to race and intelligence with the goal of supporting the idea that white people are inherently superior (the other such journal being Mankind Quarterly). Notable contributors to the journal include Jack Kemp, Jesse Helms, and Robert S. McNamara. In 1982, U.S. President Ronald Reagan wrote a letter to Pearson personally thanking him for the most recent issue of the Journal, which was never disavowed by the White House. The White House did, however, request that Pearson stop using the letter for the purposes of publicity.

References

External links

Articles at ResearchGate

1976 establishments in the United States

Economics journals
English-language journals
Fringe science journals
Political science journals
Quarterly journals
Publications established in 1976
Race and intelligence controversy
Scientific racism